Because News is a Canadian radio and television program, which airs weekly on CBC Radio One. Hosted by comedian Gavin Crawford, the program is a panel show, on which three celebrity panelists, often but not always stand-up comedians, compete to answer questions about current news stories. The program also features brief comedy interludes focused on Crawford's voice impersonations of personalities in the news.

The program debuted in September 2015. Episodes are usually taped at the Canadian Broadcasting Centre in Toronto, although selected episodes have been recorded in other cities.

A television version of the program premiered on CBC Television in October 2020.

References

External links

2015 radio programme debuts
CBC Radio One programs
Canadian comedy radio programs
Panel games
Canadian radio game shows
2010s Canadian game shows
2020s Canadian game shows
2020 Canadian television series debuts
2020s Canadian comedy television series
CBC Television original programming
Canadian Comedy Award winners